Yu Yongding (余永定) is a Chinese economist, with widely recognized influence in Chinese economic policy debates.

Biography and academic career

Yu was born in Nanjing in November 1948 in a family with ancestry from Taishan, Guangdong. He graduated from Beijing Steel and Iron Institute in 1969, received an MA in economics from the Graduate School of Chinese Academy of Social Sciences in 1983, and a D.Phil. in economics from Oxford in 1994.

He worked at Beijing Heavy Machinery Factory (北京第二通用机械厂) from 1969 to 1979. In 1979 he joined the Institute for World Economics and Politics (IWEP) at the Chinese Academy of Social Sciences (CASS) where he worked for three decades; he remains an Academician of CASS. At IWEP he was a Junior Fellow (1979-1983), Research Fellow (1983-1987), and Senior Research Fellow (from 1987); head of the Department of Western Economic Theory from 1986 to 1988; and the institute's Director for over a decade from 1998 to 2009.

From 2003 to 2011 he was President of the China Society of World Economy and Editor-in-Chief of the journal China and World Economy. He has also been Editor-in-Chief of The World Economy and of the International Review of Economics. He is the winner of the 2000-2005 Sun Yefang Prize in Economics.

Policy advice

Yu Yongding has long been involved and influential in Chinese and international monetary, fiscal and macroeconomic policy debates.

In China, from 2004 to 2006 he was a member of the Monetary Policy Committee of the People's Bank of China. He has also been a member of the Advisory Committee on National Planning of the National Development and Reform Commission (2005-2010), of the Advisory Committee on Foreign Policy of the Ministry of Foreign Affairs, and of the Foreign Affairs Committee of the Chinese People's Political Consultative Conference.

At the international level he has served on the UN Commission of Experts on Reforms of the International Monetary and Financial System (also known as Stiglitz Commission), UN Committee for Development Policy, UN High Level Panel on International Financial Accountability, Transparency and Integrity (also known as FACTI Panel), and Advisory Committee of the Asian and Pacific Department of the International Monetary Fund.

He has also been a member of the Council on Global Governance of the World Economic Forum and of the Advisory Committee and Global Commission of the Institute for New Economic Thinking, and an advisor of the China Finance 40 Forum.

Selected publications
 Western Economic Theory, Textbook for the Graduate School of Chinese Academy of Social Sciences (中国社会科学院研究生院教材·西方经济学, 2003)
 Wither RMB: Current Problems and Future Adjustment (人民币悬念:人民币汇率的当前处境和未来改革, 2003), co-authored with He Fan
 Observations on the World Economy (我看世界经济, 2004)
 Economic Globalisation and Development Trends for the International Economy (经济全球化与世界经济发展趋势, 2002), co-authored with Li Xiangyang
 The Thought Trajectory of an Academic (一个学者的思想轨迹, 2005)
 Summertime for the Chinese Economy (中国经济的夏天, 2005), co-authored with He Fan
 Globalisation and China: Theory and Development Trends (全球化与中国：理论与发展趋势, 2010), co-authored with Gao Haihong and Lu Aiguo
 Testament to Imbalances (见证失衡, 2010)
 China’s Sustainable Development: Challenges and Future (中国的可持续发展：挑战与未来, 2011)
 The Last Bottleneck: the debate between Capital Account liberalisation and Renminbi Internationalisation (最后的屏障, 2016)
 Studies on China’s Macro Controls and Regulations (九十年代以来中国宏观调控研究余永定, 2019)
 There is Nothing New Under The Sun (太阳之下无新事, 2020)

Notes

Living people
Chinese academics
Renmin University of China alumni
Alumni of Nuffield College, Oxford
Australian National University alumni
Columbia Business School faculty
Academic staff of Peking University
People from Taishan, Guangdong
1948 births
Chinese Academy of Social Sciences